Sella Italiano is a horse breed created in Italy. The Italian government has passed a law that created a stud book for the new breed. The breed  is blending the remnant indigenous Italian breeds of Maremmano, Salernitano and Persano horse with Anglo Arabo Sardo, Purosangue Orientale, Arabian and Thoroughbred. The progeny of said horses can be registered as Sella Italiano if they can pass a “performance test”. Furthermore, the stud book is open to other European warmbloods if they can pass the performance test and be approved by the breed registry. The breed is intended to produce a sport horse which can compete successfully at the international level.

External links
Sella Italiano Video
Italian Agriculture Ministry page on Sella Italiano
Disciplinare del libro genealogico del cavallo da sella italiano (in Italian). Unione Nazionale Incremento Razze Equine. Archived 25 October 2005.

Horse breeds
Horse breeds originating in Italy